Jean de Bie (9 May 1892 – 30 April 1961) was a Belgian football (soccer) player. He played as a goalkeeper.

During his career he played mostly for Royal Racing Club de Bruxelles. He won the gold medal at the 1920 Summer Olympics playing for Belgium national football team and, at 38 years of age, he was selected in the Belgian squad for the 1930 FIFA World Cup, although he never played a match at the tournament. No other player who has participated in a FIFA World Cup was born earlier than him.

References

1892 births
1930 FIFA World Cup players
1961 deaths
Belgian footballers
Belgium international footballers
Association football goalkeepers
Olympic footballers of Belgium
Olympic gold medalists for Belgium
Footballers at the 1920 Summer Olympics
Footballers at the 1924 Summer Olympics
Footballers at the 1928 Summer Olympics
Olympic medalists in football
People from Uccle
Footballers from Brussels
K.F.C. Rhodienne-De Hoek players

Medalists at the 1920 Summer Olympics